Swaroopanandendra Saraswati (born 1964) is the 1st Pīṭādipati of Vishaka Sri Sarada Peetham, Visakhapatnam. He established  the Vishaka Sri Sarada Peetham in the year of 1997.

Biography 
Sri Swaroopanandendra Saraswati was born in 1964 in Ranastalam, Srikakulam District. Swaroopanandendra Saraswati  played important and vital role in Telugu states political hinduthva politics.

References

External links

21st-century Hindu religious leaders
1964 births
Indian Hindu religious leaders
Living people